Ntombovuyo Veronica Mente is a South African politician serving as the Chairperson of the Economic Freedom Fighters (EFF) since her election in December 2019. She is also a Member of the National Assembly of South Africa, having taken office in May 2014.

Biography
Mente is from the Khayelitsha township in Cape Town. She began her career by working as a security member for the previous mayor of Cape Town. She was a "barefoot lawyer" in Khayelitsha who assisted workers. Mente was then a volunteer for the Labour Community Advice Media and Education Centre (LAMEC) in Khayelitsha.

Mente became a member of the EFF shortly after its founding. She was elected to Parliament in 2014.

In May 2019, she was re-elected for a second term as an MP. As of June 2019, she is a member of the Standing Committee on Public Accounts and an Alternate Member of the Standing Committee on the Auditor General. She became a member of the Disciplinary Committee in September 2019.

Mente was elected EFF national chairperson at the party's second elective conference in December 2019, succeeding advocate Dali Mpofu.

References

External links
Ms Ntombovuyo Veronica Mente – Parliament of South Africa
Ms Ntombovuyo Veronica Mente – People's Assembly

Living people
Year of birth missing (living people)
Economic Freedom Fighters politicians
People from Cape Town
Politicians from Cape Town
Members of the National Assembly of South Africa
Xhosa people
Women members of the National Assembly of South Africa